Lobsang Pelden Tenpe Dronme (born 1890 in Datong, Qinghai - died March 4, 1957, in Taipei, Taiwan) was a clergyman of the Gelug School of Tibetan Buddhism and the 7th Changkya Khutukhtu.  He was the highest person of Tibetan Buddhism in Inner Mongolia and the fourth highest lamas of Tibetan Buddhism in general.  He supported the Kuomintang and accompanied the Republic of China Government to Taiwan after the Chinese Civil War in 1949.  He was awarded titles by the Kuomintang and also received living expenses until his death.

After his death, his residence in Taipei was converted in February 1993 into the Mongolian and Tibetan Cultural Center, which includes a memorial to him.

See also
 Mongolians in Taiwan
 Mongolian and Tibetan Cultural Center

References

External links
 Photos of Lobsang Pelden Tenpe Dronme

Changkya Khutukhtus
Tibetan Buddhists from Taiwan
Chinese people of Mongolian descent
Tulkus
Tibetan Buddhist spiritual teachers
Gelug Buddhists
Lamas
1957 deaths
Republic of China politicians from Qinghai
Senior Advisors to President Chiang Kai-shek
1890 births
People from Xining
Chinese emigrants to Taiwan
Taiwanese people of Mongolian descent